Garam masala [from Hindustani / (garm masala, "hot spices")] is a blend of ground spices originating from India. It is common in Indian, Pakistani, Nepalese, Bangladeshi, Sri Lankan and Caribbean cuisines. It is used alone or with other seasonings.

Ingredients

The composition of garam masala differs regionally, with many recipes across the Indian subcontinent according to regional and personal taste, and none is considered more authentic than another. The components of the mix are roasted, then ground together or added to the dish for flavour just before finishing cooking.

A typical Indian version of garam masala contains (with Hindi/Urdu names in parenthesis):
 Fennel (saunf)
 Indian Bay leaves or Malabathrum (tej patta)
 Black and white peppercorns (kali/safed mirch)
 Cloves (laung)
 Cinnamon or cassia bark (dālacini)
 Mace (outer covering of nutmeg) (javitri)
 Black and green cardamom pods (ilaici)
 Cumin (jīra)
 Coriander seeds (dhania)
 Red chili powder (lāl mirch)

Some recipes call for the spices to be blended with herbs, while others call for the spices to be ground with water, vinegar, or other liquids to make a paste. Some recipes include nuts, onions or garlic, or small quantities of star anise, asafoetida, chili, stone flower (known as dagadphool, lichen), and kababchini (cubeb). The flavours may be blended to achieve a balanced effect, or a single flavour may be emphasized. A masala may be toasted before use to release its flavours and aromas. In the east of the Indian subcontinent, in West Bengal, Orissa, Assam and Bangladesh only cardamom, cinnamon and clove may be substituted for the assortment.

The Burmese masala spice blend used in Burmese curries typically consists of ground cinnamon or cassia, cardamon, cloves, and black pepper.

See also
 Baharat
 Bangladeshi cuisine
 Bengali cuisine
 Chaat masala
 Curry powder
 Indian cuisine
 Nepalese cuisine
 Pakistani cuisine
 Spice mix
 Panch phoron - Indian five spice
 Chinese five spice
 South African Indian cuisine

References

External links

 Spices Name in Hindi and English

Pakistani cuisine
Bengali cuisine
Bangladeshi cuisine
Herb and spice mixtures
Indian cuisine
Indian spices
Nepalese cuisine
Indo-Caribbean cuisine
Spices
Masalas